William Harris (born 10 March 1504), of Radford in the parish of Plymstock in Devon,  was a Member of Parliament for Newport-juxta-Launceston in Cornwall.

Origins
She survived her husband and remarried to Humphry Arundell of Lanherne, Cornwall, younger brother of Sir John Arundell (1474–1545), her brother-in-law.

Career
He was a Member of Parliament for Newport-juxta-Launceston in Cornwall, for the fifth (1529–1536) parliament of King Henry VIII, probably served in the sixth (1536) parliament, and may have served in either or both of that king's seventh (1539–1540) and eighth (1539–1542) parliaments.

Family
At some time before June 1527, he married Catherine Trecarrel, a daughter and co-heiress of Henry Trecarrell (alias Esse) of Trecarrell in Cornwall, by whom he had progeny as follows:
Christopher Harris (c. 1553–1625), a  Member of Parliament for Plymouth. He married Barbara Arscott (d. 1597/8), a daughter of John Arscott of Dunsland in the parish of Bradford (or Cookbury) in Devon. His son John Harris died young and pre-deceased his father, thus Radford passed to the descendants of Christopher's  sister Jane Harris
Jane Harris, only daughter, who in 1562/3 at Menheniot in Cornwall married he cousin John Harris (d. 1579) of Lanrest in Cornwall. As her brother's son died young, her progeny became the heirs to Radford.

References

1504 births
Year of death missing
English MPs 1529–1536
Members of the pre-1707 English Parliament for constituencies in Cornwall
People from Plymstock